The Neebing River is a freshwater river in Canada. It extends along the western portions of Thunder Bay and the Oliver Paipoonge Municipality.

The river is managed by the Lakehead Region Conservation Authority and has a watershed of 227.7 square kilometres.

References 

Rivers of Thunder Bay District